Sir Andrew Barron Murray  (born 15 May 1987) is a British professional tennis player from Scotland. He was ranked world No. 1 by the Association of Tennis Professionals (ATP) for 41 weeks, and finished as the year-end No. 1 in 2016. Murray has won three Grand Slam singles titles, two at Wimbledon (2013 and 2016) and one at the US Open (2012), and has reached eleven major finals. Murray was ranked in the top 10 for all but one month from July 2008 through October 2017, and was no lower than world No. 4 in eight of the nine year-end rankings during that span. Murray has won 46 ATP singles titles, including 14 Masters 1000 events.

Originally coached by his mother Judy alongside his older brother Jamie, Murray moved to Barcelona at age 15 to train at the Sánchez-Casal Academy. He began his professional career around the time Roger Federer and Rafael Nadal established themselves as the two dominant players in men's tennis. Murray had immediate success on the ATP Tour, making his top 10 debut in 2007 at age 19. By 2010, Murray and Novak Djokovic had joined Federer and Nadal in the Big Four, the group of players who dominated men's tennis during the 2010s. Murray initially struggled against the rest of the Big Four, losing his first four major finals (three to Federer and one to Djokovic). He made his major breakthrough in 2012 by defeating Djokovic to win the US Open, becoming the first British major singles champion since Virginia Wade in 1977, and the first male champion since Fred Perry in 1936. A month earlier, he won the men's singles gold medal against Federer at the 2012 London Olympics, and a silver medal in mixed doubles .

From 2013 through 2016, Murray reached another six major finals. He won two of these encounters, at Wimbledon in 2013 and 2016. Murray had his career-best season in 2016. During that year, Murray made three major finals, winning Wimbledon. He also defended his title at the 2016 Rio Olympics to become the only player, male or female, to win two Olympic gold medals in singles. Murray also became world No. 1 for the first time that season, and clinched the year-end No. 1 ranking by winning his only Tour Finals title over Djokovic. Since 2016, he has struggled with various injuries and fell out of the top 100 in 2018 due to only seldom playing on tour, though he has since slowly risen back to the top 50.

Murray is an all-court player who excels in particular at defense, returning serve and constructing points. He is generally regarded as having one of the best and most consistent two-handed backhands on the ATP Tour. Murray is considered a national hero in Great Britain for reestablishing the country as a leading force in men's tennis for the first time since the early 20th century. He and his brother led the Great Britain Davis Cup team to a title in 2015. Murray has been outspoken as a feminist, and became only the second top-10 player in the history of the ATP Tour to have a female coach when he hired Amélie Mauresmo. As of 2022, he is the only player to defeat Novak Djokovic in a Wimbledon final.

Early and personal life
Andy Murray was born in Glasgow, Scotland, the son of Judy Murray (née Erskine) and William Murray. His maternal grandfather, Roy Erskine, was a professional footballer in the late 1950s. Murray is a supporter of Hibernian Football Club, one of the teams his grandfather represented, and Arsenal Football Club.

Murray began playing tennis at the age of three when his mother Judy took him to play on the local courts. He played in his first competitive tournament at age five and by the time he was eight he was competing with adults in the Central District Tennis League. Murray's elder brother, Jamie, is also a professional tennis player, playing on the doubles circuit, and became a multiple Grand Slam winner in the discipline (both men's and mixed).

Murray grew up in Dunblane and attended Dunblane Primary School. He and his brother were present during the 1996 Dunblane school massacre, when Thomas Hamilton killed 16 children and a teacher before shooting himself; Murray took cover in a classroom. Murray says he was too young to understand what was happening and is generally reluctant to talk about it in interviews, but in his autobiography Hitting Back he states that he attended a youth group run by Hamilton and his mother gave Hamilton lifts in her car. Murray later attended Dunblane High School.

Murray's parents split up when he was 10, with the boys living with their father while being mentored in tennis by their mother. He believes the impact this had on him could be the reason behind his competitive spirit. At 15, he was asked to train with Rangers Football Club at their School of Excellence, but declined, opting to focus on his tennis career instead. He then decided to move to Barcelona, Spain. There he studied at the Schiller International School and trained on the clay courts of the Sánchez-Casal Academy, coached by Pato Alvarez. Murray described this time as "a big sacrifice". His parents had to find £40,000 to pay for his 18-month stay there. In Spain, he trained with Emilio Sánchez, former world No. 1 doubles player.

Murray was born with a bipartite patella, a condition in which the kneecap remains as two separate bones instead of fusing together in early childhood, but was not diagnosed until the age of 16. He has been seen holding his knee due to the pain caused by the condition and has pulled out of events because of it.

In February 2013, Murray bought Cromlix House hotel near Dunblane for £1.8 million. Brother Jamie had celebrated his wedding there in 2010 but it had since ceased trading.  The venue re-opened as a 15-room five-star hotel in April 2014. Later that month Murray was awarded freedom of Stirling and received an Honorary Doctorate from the University of Stirling in recognition of his services to tennis.

Murray began dating Kim Sears, daughter of player-turned-coach Nigel Sears, in 2005. Their engagement was announced in November 2014, and they married on 11 April 2015 at Dunblane Cathedral in his home town, with the reception at his Cromlix House hotel. The couple previously lived in Oxshott, Surrey but in 2022, moved to nearby Leatherhead, to their newly constructed home that will accommodate their young family, consisting of their son and three daughters; the youngest, a girl was born in March 2021.

He identifies himself as a feminist, and has been repeatedly vocal in his support for women players and coaches. He is also a vocal supporter of LGBT rights and supports same-sex marriage. In June 2020, he also lent his support to the Black Lives Matter movement; he and fellow players took a knee during the Schroders Battle of the Brits. Just before the 2020 US Open, he said he was "fully supportive" of Naomi Osaka's decision to sit out her semi-final match at the Western & Southern Open in the wake of Jacob Blake's shooting in Wisconsin; Osaka ultimately played the match.

Murray has invested in up to 30 UK businesses using Seedrs, a crowdfunding platform.

In January 2021, before his trip to Melbourne for the Australian Open, Murray tested positive for COVID-19 and remained in quarantine and isolating at home, eventually missing the tournament.

In March 2021, Murray decided to withdraw from the Dubai Duty Free Tennis Championships after his wife Kim Sears, gave birth to their fourth child. Murray travelled to California in October 2021 to compete in the Indian Wells Tennis Championships, following training he reported that his trainers but more importantly his wedding ring (woven into the laces) had been stolen from underneath his car in the hotel car park. Following widespread appeals on Social and on mainstream media the trainers and his wedding ring were returned and reunited with him in good time for his first competitive tennis match at Indian Wells in four years.

Junior career
Leon Smith, Murray's tennis coach from 11 to 17, described Murray as "unbelievably competitive", while Murray attributes his abilities to the motivation gained from losing to his older brother Jamie. In 1999, at the age of 12, Murray won his age group at the Orange Bowl, a prestigious event for junior players. He won it again at the age of 14, and is one of only nine tennis players to win the Junior Orange Bowl championship twice in its 70-year history, alongside the likes of Jimmy Connors, Jennifer Capriati and Monica Seles.

In July 2003, Murray started out on the Challenger and Futures circuit. In his first tournament, he reached the quarter-finals of the Manchester Challenger. In September, Murray won his first senior title by taking the Glasgow Futures event. He also reached the semi-finals of the Edinburgh Futures event.

For the first six months of 2004, Murray had a knee injury and could not play.

In July 2004, Murray played a Challenger event in Nottingham, where he lost to future Grand Slam finalist Jo-Wilfried Tsonga in the second round. Murray then went on to win Futures events in Xàtiva and Rome.

In September 2004, he won the Junior US Open and was selected for the Davis Cup World Group play-off match against Austria later that month; however, he was not selected to play. Later that year, he won BBC Young Sports Personality of the Year.

As a junior, Murray reached as high as No. 6 in the world in 2003 (and No. 8 in doubles). In the 2004-instated combined rankings, he reached No. 2 in the world.

Junior Slam results
Australian Open: –
French Open: SF (2005)
Wimbledon: 3R (2004)
US Open: W (2004)

Professional career

2005: Turning professional
Murray began 2005 ranked No. 407, but when he was in South America in January, he hurt his back and had to take three months off.

In March, he became the youngest Briton to play in the Davis Cup. Murray turned professional in April and was given a wild card entry to a clay-court tournament in Barcelona, the Open SEAT, where he lost in three sets to Jan Hernych. In April, Murray parted acrimoniously from his coach Pato Alvarez, complaining about his negative attitude. Murray then reached the semi-finals of the boys' French Open, where he lost in straight sets to Marin Čilić.

Mark Petchey agreed to coach Murray for four weeks until the end of Wimbledon, but it metamorphosed into a full-time position. Given a wild card to Queen's, Murray progressed past Santiago Ventura in straight sets for his first ATP match win. Following a second-round win against Taylor Dent, he played former Australian Open champion Thomas Johansson in the third round, losing in three sets after cramping and twisting his ankle. Following his performance at Queen's, Murray received a wild card for Wimbledon. Ranked No. 312, Murray became the first Scot in the Open Era to reach the third round of the men's singles tournament at Wimbledon. In the third round, Murray lost to 2002 Wimbledon finalist David Nalbandian due to cramping and fatigue, having led two sets to love.

Following Wimbledon, Murray won Challenger events on the hard courts of Aptos and Binghamton, New York. He then experienced his first Masters event at Cincinnati, where he beat Taylor Dent, before losing in three sets to then-No. 4, Marat Safin. With a wild card entry, Murray played Andrei Pavel in the opening round of the US Open, where he recovered from down two sets to one to win his first five-set match. However, he lost in the second round to Arnaud Clément in another five-set contest. Murray was again selected for the Davis Cup match against Switzerland. He was picked for the opening singles rubbers, losing in straight sets to Stanislas Wawrinka. Murray made his first ATP final at the Thailand Open where he faced No. 1 Roger Federer. Murray lost in straight sets.

Murray beat Tim Henman in their first meeting, at the Basel Swiss Indoors in the first round, and eventually reached the quarter-finals.

In November, Murray captained Scotland at the inaugural Aberdeen Cup against England led by Greg Rusedski. This was an exhibition tournament and the only event where Murray played Rusedski, they never met on the Tour. Rusedski beat Murray in the first match, but Murray won the second. This was also the first time that Andy and his brother Jamie Murray played doubles as seniors. Scotland defeated England 4½ – 2½. He completed the year ranked No. 64 and was named the 2005 BBC Scotland Sports Personality of the Year.

2006: First ATP title and British No. 1
The 2006 season saw Murray compete on the full circuit for the first time and split with his coach Mark Petchey and team up with Brad Gilbert.

At the SAP Open in San Jose in February, Murray defeated a top ten player for the first time, Andy Roddick. Murray went on to claim the title defeating No. 11 Lleyton Hewitt.  As a result, Murray became the British No. 1 later that month, ending Tim Henman's seven-year run. Murray was now world No. 42, Greg Rusedski No. 43, and Tim Henman No. 49. Rusedski regained his British No. 1 status on 15 May for eight weeks.

Murray suffered a straight sets defeat at the Australian Open, to Argentine Juan Ignacio Chela in the first round and to Gaël Monfils at the French Open, in five sets. Murray did reach the fourth round for the first time at both Wimbledon (beating 3rd seed Andy Roddick in the 3rd round) and the US Open.

Murray played in Davis Cup ties against Serbia, Israel and Ukraine. Murray missed the opening singles matches before losing the doubles as Britain lost their tie against Serbia. During the tie with Israel, Murray won his rubber and lost the doubles before pulling out with a neck injury before the reverse singles, as Britain lost the tie. Against Ukraine, Murray won both his singles rubbers, but lost the doubles, as Britain won the tie.

At the Masters, Murray lost in the first round in Miami, Monte Carlo and Rome. Murray went out of the tournaments in Indian Wells and Hamburg in the second round. Murray reached his first Masters semi-final in Toronto at the Rogers Cup, losing to Richard Gasquet.

At Cincinnati, Murray became only one of two players, alongside Rafael Nadal, to defeat Roger Federer in 2006, breaking the Swiss star's 55 match winning streak on hard courts. He lost two rounds later to Andy Roddick, but broke into the top 20 for the first time. In the final two Masters events in Madrid and Paris, Murray exited both tournaments at the last-16 stage ending his season, with losses to Novak Djokovic and Dominik Hrbatý. Murray was a finalist at the Legg Mason Tennis Classic. Playing doubles with his brother in Bangkok the pair reached the final. After the French Open, where Murray was injured again, he revealed that his bones hadn't fully grown, causing him to suffer from cramps and back problems.

In November, the Aberdeen Cup was held for the second time, with Murray leading team Scotland and Greg Rusedski captaining England. Scotland won 6½–1.

2007: Ascending to the top 10
Murray reached the fourth round of the Australian Open, where he lost a five-set match against No. 2, Rafael Nadal.

Following the Miami Masters, where he reached the semi-finals, Murray reached the No. 10 ranking on 16 April.

The British No. 1 sustained tendon damage during his first round match at the German Open in Hamburg. Murray was up 5–1 when he hit a forehand from the back of the court and snapped the tendons in his wrist, leaving him out of action from 15 May until 7 August, thereby missing Wimbledon. During this rest period, Murray rose to No. 8, but by 7 August, he had dropped to No. 14.

Murray suffered a third round loss at the US Open. At the Masters tournaments, Murray reached the semi-finals of Indian Wells and Miami. At Rome and Cincinnati, Murray exited in the first round whilst going out in the second in Canada. In the final two masters tournaments, Murray exited in the third round in Madrid and he went out in the quarter-finals of Paris.  Murray won titles in San Jose and St. Petersburg. He also reached the final of tournaments in Doha and Metz, finishing the season ranked 11th in the world.

In November, Murray split with his coach Brad Gilbert and added a team of experts along with Miles Maclagan, his main coach.

2008: First major final and Masters titles

In 2008, Murray suffered a first round loss at the Australian Open to eventual runner-up Jo-Wilfried Tsonga, and a third round loss at the French Open to Nicolás Almagro. Murray then made his first Grand Slam quarter-final at Wimbledon before making his first final at the US Open. During the tournament in New York, Murray claimed his first win over Nadal. That victory meant that he became the first player from Britain since Greg Rusedski in 1997 to reach a major final. In his first Grand Slam final Murray suffered a straight sets loss to Federer. At the Beijing Olympics, Murray suffered one of the worst defeats of his career, losing his first round singles match to No. 77 Yen-hsun Lu of Taiwan in straight sets. That abject defeat was still on his mind in a BBC interview five years later – despite an intervening Olympic gold medal and a head-to-head win – when he met the same player (now ranked No. 75) in the second round of Wimbledon 2013.

In the Masters tournaments, Murray went out in round four in Indian Wells and the first round of Miami. In the clay Masters Murray made the third round of Monte Carlo and Hamburg and the second of Rome. On the American hard court swing Murray made the semi-finals of Toronto before winning his first Masters shield in Cincinnati. He added another shield to his collection in Madrid; before losing in the quarter-finals of Paris. Now at No. 4 in the world, Murray qualified for the first time for the Masters Cup. He played well in defeating an injured Federer but lost to Davydenko in the semi-finals. Murray ended 2008 ranked No. 4. Murray also won tournaments in Doha, Marseille and St Petersburg.

2009: Ascent to world No. 2 and two Masters titles
Murray opened the 2009 season with a successful defence of his title at the Qatar Open in Doha, defeating Andy Roddick in straight sets. At the Australian Open, Murray made it to the fourth round, losing to Fernando Verdasco. Murray won his eleventh career title in Rotterdam, defeating No. 1, Nadal in three sets. Murray next went to Dubai but withdrew before the quarter-finals with a re-occurrence of a virus that had affected him at the Australian Open. The virus caused Murray to miss a Davis Cup tie in Glasgow. Murray then lost in the finals to Nadal at Indian Wells, but won a week later in Miami over Djokovic for another masters title.

In the lead-up to the French Open, Murray beat No. 9, Nikolay Davydenko at the Monte Carlo Masters, the first time he had beaten a top ten player on clay, though he lost to Nadal in the semi-finals. Murray was upset in round two of the Rome Masters by qualifier Juan Mónaco, and he reached the quarter-finals of the Madrid Masters, losing to Juan Martín del Potro. During this time Murray achieved the highest ever ranking of a British male in the Open Era when he reached the No. 3 ranking on 11 May 2009. Murray reached the quarter-finals of the French Open, but was defeated by Fernando González in four sets.

Murray won a title for the first time on grass at Queen's and became the first British winner of the tournament since 1938. In the final Murray defeated American James Blake. At Wimbledon, against Stanislas Wawrinka, Murray's fourth round match was the first match to be played entirely under Wimbledon's retractable roof. This also enabled it to be the then latest finishing match ever at Wimbledon, a record he would go on to eclipse three years later in a second round match against Marcos Baghdatis. However Murray lost a tight semi-final to Andy Roddick.

Murray returned to action in Montreal, defeating del Potro in three sets to take the title. After this victory, he overtook Nadal in the rankings and held the number two position until the start of the US Open. Murray followed the Masters win playing at the Cincinnati Masters, where he lost to Federer. At the US Open, Murray was hampered by a wrist injury and suffered a straight-sets loss to Čilić. Murray won both his singles matches, and lost at doubles in the Davis Cup against Poland, but then missed six weeks with a wrist injury.

In November, Murray won at Valencia, but bowed out in round two of the Paris Masters. To end the season, Murray did not make it out of the round robin at the World Tour Finals in London. He ended the year ranked #4 for the second consecutive year.

2010: Hopman Cup and Australian Open finals
Murray and Laura Robson represented Britain at the Hopman Cup. The pair progressed to the final, where they were beaten by Spain. At the Australian Open Murray beat Nadal and Čilić before losing in the final to  Roger Federer.

At the BNP Paribas Open in Indian Wells, Murray reached the quarter-finals, losing to Robin Söderling in straight sets. Murray next played at the 2010 Sony Ericsson Open, but lost his first match of the tournament to Mardy Fish, afterwards saying that his mind hadn't been fully on tennis. At the Monte-Carlo Rolex Masters, Murray suffered another first match loss, this time to Philipp Kohlschreiber. He entered the doubles competition with Ross Hutchins; the duo lost to the Bryan Brothers on a champions tie-breaker. Murray reached the third round in the Rome Masters, and the quarter-finals at the Madrid Masters, losing both times to David Ferrer.

After playing an exhibition match, Murray started the French Open with three tough wins, before losing in straight sets to Tomáš Berdych in the fourth round. In London, Murray progressed to the third round, where he faced Mardy Fish. At 3–3 in the final set with momentum going Murray's way (he had just come back from 3–0 down), the match was called off for bad light, leaving Murray fuming. Coming back the next day, Murray was edged out by the eventual finalist in a tie-breaker for his second defeat by him in the year. At Wimbledon, Murray progressed to the semi-finals, losing to Nadal in straight sets. On 27 July 2010, Murray and his coach Maclagan split, and Murray replaced him with Àlex Corretja.

Starting the US hard-court season with the 2010 Farmers Classic, Murray reached the final but lost against Sam Querrey in three sets. This was his first loss to Querrey in five career meetings. In Canada, Murray became the first player since Andre Agassi in 1995 to defend the Canadian Masters. Murray defeated Nadal and then Federer in straight sets, ending his eight-month title drought. At the Cincinnati Masters, Murray first complained about the speed of the court, and then in a quarter-final match with Fish, Murray complained that the organisers refused to put the match on later in the day With temperatures reaching 33 °C in the shade, Murray won the first set in a tie-breaker but began to feel ill. The doctor was called on court to actively cool Murray down. Murray said after the match that he had considered retiring. He lost the second set, but forced a final-set tie-breaker, before Fish won. After losing to Stanislas Wawrinka in the third round of the US Open, questions about Murray's conditioning arose, as he called the trainer out twice during the match.

His next event was the China Open in Beijing, where Murray reached the quarter-finals, losing to Ivan Ljubičić. Murray then won the Shanghai Rolex Masters dismissing Roger Federer in straight sets. He did not drop a single set throughout the event. Murray returned to Spain to defend his title at the Valencia Open 500 but lost in the second round to Juan Mónaco. However, in doubles, Murray partnered his brother Jamie Murray to the final, where they defeated Mahesh Bhupathi and Max Mirnyi. The victory was Murray's first doubles title and the second time he had reached a final with his brother.

Murray reached the quarter-finals at the BNP Paribas Masters losing to Gaël Monfils in three sets. Combined with his exit and Söderling's taking the title, Murray found himself pushed down a spot in the rankings, to No. 5 from No. 4. At the Tour finals in London, Murray went 2–1 in round robin play before facing Nadal in the semi-final. They battled for over three hours, before Murray fell to the Spaniard in a final-set tie-breaker, bringing an end to his season. He ended the year ranked #4 for the third consecutive year.

2011: Consistency in slams and two more Masters
Murray and Laura Robson lost in the round-robin stage 2011 Hopman Cup, losing all three ties even though Murray won all of his singles matches. Then Murray, along with other stars such as Federer, Nadal, and Djokovic, participated in the Rally for Relief event to help raise money for the flood victims in Queensland.

Seeded fifth in the 2011 Australian Open, Murray met former champion Novak Djokovic in the final and was defeated in straight sets. In Rotterdam, he was defeated by Marcos Baghdatis in the first round. Murray reached the semi-finals of the doubles tournament with his brother Jamie. Murray lost to qualifiers in the first rounds at the Masters Series events in Indian Wells and Miami, after which he split with coach Àlex Corretja.

Murray returned to form at the Monte-Carlo Rolex Masters, but lost to Nadal in the semi-finals. Murray sustained an elbow injury before the match and subsequently withdrew from the 2011 Barcelona Open Banco Sabadell due to the injury. Murray lost in the third round at the Mutua Madrileña Madrid Open, but made it to the semi-finals of the Rome Masters, where he lost to Novak Djokovic.

At the French Open, Murray won two tough early matches, before losing in his first semi-final at Roland Garros, against Rafael Nadal.

Murray defeated Jo-Wilfried Tsonga to win his second Queen's Club title. At Wimbledon, Murray lost in the semi-final to Nadal, despite taking the first set. At the Davis Cup tie between Great Britain and Luxembourg, Murray led the British team to victory. Murray was the two-time defending 2011 Rogers Cup champion, but lost in the second round to South African Kevin Anderson. However, the following week, he won the 2011 Western & Southern Open after Novak Djokovic retired due to injury. At the 2011 US Open, Murray battled from two sets down to win a five-set second-round encounter with Robin Haase, but lost in the semi-finals to Rafael Nadal in four sets. This was the first time in his career that Andy had reached the quarter-finals, or better, at all four slams in a calendar year.

Murray easily won the small 250-class Thailand Open, and the following week he won his third title in four tournaments at the Rakuten Japan Open Tennis Championships. His opponent in the final was Rafael Nadal, whom he beat for the first time in the year in three sets. Murray then won the doubles with his brother Jamie Murray, becoming the first person in the 2011 season to capture both singles and doubles titles at the same tournament. Murray then successfully defended his Shanghai Masters crown with a straight-sets victory over David Ferrer in the final. At the ATP World Tour Finals, Murray lost to David Ferrer in straight sets and withdrew from the tournament after the loss with a groin pull. Murray ended the year ranked #4, behind Djokovic, Nadal, and Federer, for the fourth consecutive year.

2012: Olympic Gold, US Open champion, and Wimbledon runner-up

With Ivan Lendl as his new full-time coach, Murray began the season by playing in the 2012 Brisbane International. He overcame a slow start in his first two matches to win his 22nd title by beating Alexandr Dolgopolov in the final. In doubles, he lost in the quarter-finals against second seeds Jürgen Melzer and Philipp Petzschner in a tight match. After an exhibition tournament, Murray made it to the semi-finals of the 2012 Australian Open, where he was defeated by Djokovic in a four-hour-and 50-minute match.

At the Dubai Duty Free Tennis Championships, Murray defeated Djokovic in the semi-finals, but lost in the final to Roger Federer. After an early defeat at the BNP Paribas Open, Murray made the final of the Miami Masters, losing to Djokovic. Murray then had quarter-final losses at the Monte Carlo Masters and Barcelona Open, and a third round loss at the Italian Open. Murray battled back spasms throughout the French Open, and in the quarter-finals, he was beaten by David Ferrer.

Murray lost in the opening round of the Queen's Club Championships to No. 65 Nicolas Mahut. At Wimbledon, Murray set the then record for the latest finish at the championships when he completed a four-set victory over Marcos Baghdatis at 23:02 BST, which was eclipsed by the 2018 Wimbledon men's singles semi-finals which saw play being completed at 23:03 BST. Murray beat Jo-Wilfried Tsonga in the semi-final in four sets to become the first male British player to reach the final of Wimbledon since Bunny Austin in 1938. In the final, he faced Federer, but after taking the first set, he lost the match in four sets.

Murray returned to Wimbledon within weeks, this time to compete in the London 2012 Summer Olympics in singles, doubles, and mixed doubles. He partnered his brother Jamie Murray in doubles and suffered a first-round exit to Austria (Jürgen Melzer and Alexander Peya) in three sets. In the mixed doubles, Murray was partnered by Laura Robson. They made it all the way to the finals where they lost to the Belarusian top seeds (Victoria Azarenka and Max Mirnyi) in three sets, settling for the silver medal. In singles, Murray lost only one set on his way to the finals where he met Federer, defeating him in straight sets, for the loss of just 7 games. By winning the Olympic gold medal, Murray became the first British man to win the Olympic singles gold medal in tennis since Josiah Ritchie in 1908, and only the 7th man in the open era to win two medals at the same Olympic Games.
Murray retired early in the Rogers Cup due to a knee injury, and was beaten by unseeded Jérémy Chardy at the Cincinnati Masters in straight sets.

He next competed in the final major of the season at the US Open. He cruised through his opening two rounds in straight sets against Alex Bogomolov and Ivan Dodig, before facing a tough four-set battle with Feliciano López, where Murray had to win three tie-breakers. In the fourth round, he defeated the Canadian Milos Raonic in straight sets, and then in the quarter-finals, had to come from a set and two breaks down against Marin Čilić to prevail in four. In the semi-finals, he defeated Tomáš Berdych in a long-fought match that lasted almost four hours, to reach his second consecutive Grand Slam final. Murray defeated Djokovic in five sets, becoming the first British man to win a Grand Slam final since Fred Perry in 1936, and the first Scottish-born player to win a Grand Slam final since Harold Mahony in 1896. The win would also set several records for Murray: it involved the longest tiebreak in US Open final history at 12–10 in the first set, it made Murray the first man ever to win an Olympic gold medal and the US Open in the same year, and it tied with the 1988 US Open final (in which Murray's coach Lendl competed) as the longest final in the tournament's history. By defeating Djokovic in the final, Murray achieved his 100th Grand Slam match win of his career. The victory made Murray part of the "Big Four" according to many pundits and contemporaries, including Novak Djokovic.

In his first tournament after the US Open, Murray reached the semi-finals of the Rakuten Japan Open after entering as defending champion. He was beaten by Milos Raonic in a close three-set match. He was defending champion in the doubles with his brother Jamie. However, they were knocked out in the quarter-finals by top seeds Leander Paes and Radek Štěpánek. At the penultimate Masters 1000 tournament of the year in Shanghai, after receiving a bye into round two, Murray's first match was due to be played against Florian Mayer. However, Mayer had to pull out due to injury, giving Murray a walkover into round three. After beating Alexandr Dolgopolov in the third round, he then overcame Radek Štěpánek in a three-set quarter-final. Murray next faced Roger Federer in the semi-finals, whom he defeated in straight sets to set up a second consecutive final against Djokovic, and his third consecutive Shanghai final. After failing to capitalise on five match points, Murray eventually lost in three sets, bringing to an end his 12–0 winning streak at the competition.
When Nadal pulled out of both the Paris Masters and the year-end championships, Murray finished the year at No. 3, after four years at No. 4. This was the first time Murray had finished the year higher than No. 4. At the BBC Sports Personality of the Year Murray found himself voted third overall, ahead of Mo Farah. Murray won the World Breakthrough of the Year at the Laureus World Sports Awards.

Murray was appointed Officer of the Order of the British Empire (OBE) in the 2013 New Year Honours for services to tennis.

2013: Wimbledon champion and back surgery

Murray began his 2013 season by retaining his Brisbane International title, defeating Grigor Dimitrov in the final in straight sets. Trying to win his second major in a row, he began the 2013 Australian Open well with a straight sets victory over Dutchman Robin Haase. He followed this up with straight set victories over João Sousa, practice partner Ričardas Berankis and French No. 14 seed Gilles Simon. In the quarter-finals he cruised past Jérémy Chardy in straight sets to set up a semi-final clash with Roger Federer. After exchanging sets, Murray eventually prevailed in 5 sets, recording his first Grand Slam tournament triumph over Federer. With this victory, each member of the ATP's most dominant quartet of the previous four years (Federer, Nadal, Djokovic and Murray) had beaten the other three at the majors. This victory set up Murray's third consecutive major final appearance, and second in a row against Djokovic. After taking the first set in a tiebreak, Murray was eventually defeated in four sets. His defeat in this final meant that Murray became only the second man in the Open Era to achieve three runner-up finishes at the Australian Open, the other being Stefan Edberg.

At the BNP Paribas Open in Indian Wells, Murray lost at the quarter-final stage to Juan Martín del Potro in three sets. At the Miami Masters, Murray made it through his first four matches without dropping a set, and after overcoming Richard Gasquet in the semi-finals, faced David Ferrer in the final. After losing the first set, and facing match point in the decider at 5–6, Murray eventually took the match in a third-set tiebreaker to win his second Miami Masters title, and leapfrog Roger Federer into second place in the rankings, ending a near-decade long time period in which either Federer or Rafael Nadal were ranked in the top two. Murray briefly fell back to No. 3, following a third round defeat by Stanislas Wawrinka in Monte-Carlo, but reclaimed the No. 2 ranking as a result of Federer failing to defend his title at the Mutua Madrid Open. Later, Murray lost at the quarter-final stage to Tomáš Berdych in straight sets.

At the Rome Masters, Murray retired due to a hip injury during his second round match against Marcel Granollers on his 26th birthday. Murray had just battled back to tie the match at one set all after winning the second set on a tiebreak. This left Murray with only eleven days to be fit for the start of the French Open.

Speaking at a press conference after the match, Murray said, "As it is, I'd be very surprised if I was playing in Paris. I need to make a plan as to what I do. I'll chat with the guys tonight and make a plan for the next few days then make a decision on Paris after the next five days." He would go on to withdraw from Roland Garros later, citing a back injury. After a four-week break due to injury, Murray made his comeback at the 2013 Aegon Championships, where he was the top seed. After a rain delayed first day, Murray had to complete his second round match against Nicolas Mahut, and his subsequent match against Marinko Matosevic on the same day, both of which he won in straight sets. After beating Benjamin Becker in the quarter-finals, Murray next faced his first top ten opponent since losing to Tomáš Berdych in Madrid, taking on Jo-Wilfried Tsonga in the semi-finals. After dropping the first set against the Frenchman, Murray eventually raised his level and won in three to set up a final against Marin Čilić of Croatia, his third consecutive final on grass courts. He came from behind again to beat Čilić in three sets to claim his third title at Queen's Club.

Going into Wimbledon, Murray had not lost a match on grass since the previous year's final, and was on a winning streak of 11 matches on grass. In the first two rounds, Murray faced Benjamin Becker and Yen-hsun Lu respectively, defeating both in straight sets. His third round match was against 32nd seed Tommy Robredo, and despite a tour comeback over the past year, Murray overcame the Spaniard in straight sets to set up a clash with Mikhail Youzhny, the highest seed left in Murray's half following the unexpectedly early exits of Roger Federer and Rafael Nadal. Despite facing a fightback in the second set, Murray won in straight sets to make it through to his tenth consecutive Grand Slam quarter-final, in which he was to play Fernando Verdasco, the first left-handed player Murray had faced since the 2012 US Open. For the seventh time in his career, Murray had to come back from a deficit of two sets to ultimately come through in five, setting up a semi-final clash with 24th seed Jerzy Janowicz, the Polish player who beat Murray in their previous encounter. After Murray failed to break Janowicz's serve, the Pole took the opening set in the tiebreak, following a double fault from Murray. However, Murray managed to up his level of play, and won the next three sets, making it through to his second consecutive Wimbledon final, and third consecutive major final against Novak Djokovic.

Despite the Serb being the favourite to win the title throughout the Championships, Murray overcame Djokovic in a straight sets match that lasted over three hours, to become the first British winner of the men's singles title since Fred Perry in 1936, the first Scot of either sex to win a Wimbledon singles title since Harold Mahony in 1896, and to extend his winning streak on grass to 18 matches.

At the US Open, Murray entered a Grand Slam tournament as defending champion for the first time and started strongly with a straight sets win against Michaël Llodra. He backed this up with wins over Leonardo Mayer, Florian Mayer and Denis Istomin to reach the quarter-finals at a major for the 11th straight tournament. In the last 8, Murray faced Stanislas Wawrinka of Switzerland, but lost in straight sets, ending Murray's streak of four consecutive major finals. Following his disappointing run of form on hard courts, Murray next joined the Great Britain Davis Cup team in their World Group Play-off tie on clay against Croatia, where he played in two singles and the doubles rubbers. After defeating 16-year-old Borna Ćorić in straight sets, Murray teamed up with Colin Fleming to defeat Croatian number 1 Ivan Dodig and Mate Pavić in the doubles, and take a 2–1 lead in the tie. Murray then sealed Britain's return to the World Group by defeating Dodig in straight sets.

Following the Davis Cup, Murray's season was cut short by his decision to undergo surgery, in order to sort out the lower back problems that had caused him problems since the early stages of the previous season. After being forced to withdraw from the French Open in May, the injury flared up again during the US Open and later during the Davis Cup World Group Play-offs, Murray made the decision that surgery was the best way to sort the problem out for the long-term. Following the conclusion of the 2013 season, Murray was voted the 2013 BBC Sports Personality of the Year, after having been heavy favourite since the nominees were announced.

2014: 30th career title and out of top 10

Murray started his season at the Qatar Open in Doha. In the first round, he defeated Mousa Shanan Zayed in straight sets in 37 minutes without dropping a single game, but was defeated in three sets by No. 40 Florian Mayer in the second round, despite being a set and a break up three games into the second set. He then played a warm-up match at the 2014 AAMI Classic in Kooyong against No. 43 Lleyton Hewitt, losing in two close tiebreaks.

He next headed to Melbourne for the 2014 Australian Open, where he drew the No. 112, Go Soeda of Japan. Despite worries that he was not match-fit, Murray got off to a strong start, dispatching the Japanese number 2 in under 90 minutes, losing just 5 games in the process. He next went on to defeat Vincent Millot and Feliciano López respectively in straight sets. In the fourth round, Murray dropped his first set of the tournament on his way to beating Stephane Robert in four sets to set up a meeting with long-standing rival Roger Federer in the quarter-finals. Despite saving two match points to take the third set, he ultimately went out in four, ending his streak of four consecutive Australian Open semi-finals. As a result of losing before the final, Murray fell to No. 6, falling out of the top 5 for the first time since 2008.

He next headed to the United States to compete in the Davis Cup World Group first round with Great Britain, who went into the tie as outsiders. Murray won both of his ties against Donald Young and Sam Querrey respectively, helping Britain to their first Davis Cup quarter-final since 1986. Murray's next tournament was the Rotterdam Open after receiving a late wild card, however he lost to Marin Čilić in straight sets in the quarter-finals. His following competition, the Mexican Open in Acapulco, ended in a semi-final defeat by Grigor Dimitrov in a thrilling three-setter that required two tiebreakers to decide the final two sets.

At Indian Wells, Murray struggled in his first two matches against Lukáš Rosol and Jiří Veselý respectively, overcoming both in close three-set encounters to set up a fourth round clash with Canadian Milos Raonic, which he lost in three sets. Murray offered to play with 2012 Wimbledon Doubles champion Jonathan Marray, because Marray was unable to convince anyone to join him on court. For Murray's and Marray's first competitive match together, they won a doubles clash against Gaël Monfils and Juan Mónaco only to lose in the second round to the No 2 seeds Alexander Peya and Bruno Soares.

In March, Murray split with coach Ivan Lendl, who had been widely praised for helping Murray achieve his goal of winning Grand Slam titles. At the 2014 Miami Masters, Murray defeated Matthew Ebden, Feliciano López and Jo Wilfried Tsonga but lost to Djokovic in the quarter-finals. In the Davis Cup quarter-finals against Italy, he beat Andreas Seppi in his first rubber, then teamed up with Colin Fleming to win the doubles rubber. Murray had only beaten one top ten player on clay, Nikolay Davydenko, back in 2009, and so in his final singles match, was stunned by Fabio Fognini in straight sets, which took Great Britain to the deciding final rubber. However, in this match his compatriot, James Ward was defeated by Andreas Seppi, also in straight sets, knocking Murray and Great Britain out of the Davis Cup.

Murray next competed at the Madrid Open and following his opening win, over Nicolas Almagro, he dedicated the victory to former player Elena Baltacha. He then lost to qualifier Santiago Giraldo in the following round. Murray then reached the quarter-finals of the Rome Masters where he lost to No. 1 Rafael Nadal in a tight match in which he had been up a break in the final set. At the French Open, Murray defeated Andrey Golubev and Marinko Matosevic before edging out 28th seed Philipp Kohlschreiber 12–10 in the final set. This was the first time Murray had ever gone beyond 7–5 in a deciding set. He followed this up with a straight sets win over Fernando Verdasco and then recorded a five set victory over Frenchman Gaël Monfils in the quarter-final, which saw Murray rise to No. 5 and equal his best ever French Open by reaching the semi-finals. However, he subsequently lost to Nadal in straight sets, winning only 6 games in the match. After losing the 2014 French Open semi-finals to Nadal, Murray appointed former women's world No. 1, and two-times slam titlist, Amélie Mauresmo as his coach in a 'historic move' which made Mauresmo the first woman to coach a top male tennis player.

After strong grass court seasons in 2012 and 2013, Murray was seeded third for the 2014 Wimbledon Championship, behind Novak Djokovic and Rafael Nadal, who were seeded first and second respectively. He began his title defence with straight sets wins over David Goffin and Blaž Rola, defeating the latter for the loss of just two games. Murray continued his good form, defeating Roberto Bautista Agut and Kevin Anderson, the 27th and 20th seeds, again in straight sets to reach his seventh consecutive Wimbledon quarter-final. Murray's defence then came to a halt as Grigor Dimitrov ended his 17 match winning-streak on the grass of Wimbledon (this includes the 2012 Olympics) with a straight sets win, meaning Murray failed to reach the semi-finals for the first time since 2008. After his defeat at the Championships, Murray dropped to No. 10, his lowest ranking since 2008.

Before the North American hard court swing, Murray announced he was extending his partnership with Amélie Mauresmo until the end of the US Open, but was ideally looking for a long-term deal. He also revealed he had only just returned to a full training schedule following his back surgery last September. Murray reached back-to-back quarter-finals at the Canadian Open and Cincinnati Masters, losing to eventual champions Jo Wilfried Tsonga, after being a break up in the decider, and Roger Federer, after being two breaks up in the second set, respectively. He made it to the quarter-finals of the 2014 US Open, losing to Novak Djokovic, after earning his first top ten win of the year in the previous round against Jo Wilfried Tsonga. This was the first season since 2009 where Murray failed to reach a grand slam final. As a consequence Murray fell outside of the top 10 ranking places for the first time since June 2008.

Murray took a wildcard into the inaugural Shenzhen Open in China, entering as the number 2 seed. Victories over Somdev Devvarman, Lukáš Lacko and Juan Mónaco saw Murray reach his first final of the season, breaking a drought of 14 months following his title at Wimbledon. In the final, he faced Tommy Robredo of Spain, the second final between the two. After saving five championship points in the second set tie break, Murray went on to win the title in three sets, Robredo's drop in fitness ultimately proving decisive. He then took his good form into Beijing, where he reached the semi-finals before losing to Djokovic in straight sets, however he lost in the third round at the Shanghai Masters to David Ferrer despite being a set up. Following his early exit in Shanghai, Murray took a wildcard into the Vienna Open in an attempt to claim a place at the ATP World Tour Finals. He reached the final, where he once again faced Ferrer, and triumphed in three sets for his second title of the season, and the 30th of his career. Murray defeated Ferrer again in the semi-finals of the Valencia Open to move into his third final in five weeks, and further strengthen his bid for a place at the season finale in London. In a repeat of the Shenzhen Open final, Murray again saved five championship points as he overcame Tommy Robredo in three sets. Murray then went on to reach the quarter-finals of the Paris Masters, where he was eliminated by Djokovic in what was his 23rd match in the space of only 37 days. However, his win over Dimitrov in the third round had already guaranteed him a spot at the ATP World Tour Finals.

At the ATP World Tour Finals, Murray lost his opening round robin match to Kei Nishikori but won his second match against Milos Raonic. However, he lost his final group match against Federer in straight sets and only managed to win one game against him, marking his worst defeat since losing to Djokovic in the 2007 Miami Masters, eliminating him from the tournament.

Following the conclusion of the season, Murray mutually agreed on a split with long-term backroom staff, training partner Dani Vallverdu and fitness coach Jez Green. They had been with him for five and seven years respectively but were both reported to have been unhappy at the lack of consultation they had been given about the appointment of Mauresmo. Murray also took part in the inaugural season of the International Premier Tennis League, representing the Manila Mavericks, who had drafted him as an icon player in February. Murray took part in the first three matches of the tournament which were all played in Manila.

2015: Davis Cup champion and return to world No. 2

Murray began his year by winning an exhibition event in Abu Dhabi. He then played the Hopman Cup with Heather Watson and, despite winning all his singles matches in straight sets, they finished second in their group behind Poland. His first competitive tournament of the year was the Australian Open. He won his opening three matches in straight sets before defeating 11th seed Grigor Dimitrov to reach the quarter-final. Wins over Nick Kyrgios and Tomáš Berdych followed as Murray reached his fourth final at the tournament (three of which were against Djokovic) and the eighth grand slam final of his career. He lost the final to Novak Djokovic in four sets, however his run to the final saw his return to the top four in the world rankings for the first time in 12 months.

Murray next participated in the Rotterdam Open as the top seed, but he lost in the quarter-finals to Gilles Simon who ended a 12 match losing streak against Murray. Murray then played in the Dubai Championships but suffered another quarter-final defeat to 18-year-old Borna Ćorić and as a result, Murray slipped to No. 5 behind Rafael Nadal and Kei Nishikori. Afterwards, Murray played the Davis Cup World Group in Glasgow against the United States. He won both his matches against Donald Young and John Isner, allowing Great Britain to progress to the quarter-finals for the second consecutive time with a 3–2 lead over the United States.

Murray then reached the semi-finals of the 2015 Indian Wells, overtaking Tim Henman's record of 496 career wins to have the most career wins for a British man in the Open Era. However, he suffered a 6th consecutive defeat to Djokovic in straight sets. Murray then reached the final of the 2015 Miami Open, recording his 500th career win along the way to become the first British player to have 500 or more wins in the Open Era. He went on to lose the final to Djokovic, this time in three sets. Murray added Jonas Björkman to his coaching staff in March initially on a five-week trial to help out in periods when Mauresmo was unavailable as she only agreed to work with him for 25 weeks. However, at the end of the Australian Open, Mauresmo had informed Murray that she was pregnant and he announced at the end of April, that Björkman would be his main coach for all of the grass court season and all of the US hard court swing, while Mauresmo would only be with the team for Wimbledon.

Murray won his first ATP clay court title at the 2015 BMW Open. He defeated German Philipp Kohlschreiber in three close sets to become the first Briton since Buster Mottram in 1976 to win a tour level clay court event. The following week he reached his second final on clay, at the Madrid Open after recording only his second and third victories over top 10 opposition on clay, against Raonic and Nishikori. In the final, he defeated Rafael Nadal in straight sets for his first Madrid title on clay, and first ever clay court Masters 1000 title. The win was Murray's first over Nadal, Federer or Djokovic since Wimbledon 2013, and his first over Nadal on a clay court.

Murray continued his winning streak at the Italian Open, beating Jeremy Chardy in straight sets in his opening match, but then withdrew due to fatigue after having played nine matches in the space of 10 days. Murray then reached his third semi-final at the French Open, but lost to Djokovic in five sets after threatening a comeback from two sets to love down, ending his 15 match winning streak on clay. To start his grass court campaign, Murray went on to win a record-tying fourth Queen's Club title, defeating the big serving South African Kevin Anderson in straight sets in the final. At the third grand slam of the year, the 2015 Wimbledon Championships, Murray dropped only two sets on his way to setting up a semi-final clash with Roger Federer. Murray lost to the Swiss veteran in straight sets, gaining only one break point in the entire match.

After Wimbledon, Murray returned to Queen's Club, to play for Great Britain against France in their Davis Cup quarter-final tie. Great Britain went 1–0 down when James Ward lost to Gilles Simon in straight sets, however Murray levelled the tie with a victory against Jo-Wilfried Tsonga. Murray then teamed up with his brother Jamie to win the doubles rubber, coming back from a set down to defeat Tsonga and Nicolas Mahut in four sets, giving Britain a crucial 2–1 lead going into the final day. He then faced Simon in the fourth rubber and after initially being a set and a break down, he suddenly found his form again towards the end of the second set and eventually won in four sets, winning 12 of the last 15 games in the process (with Simon struggling from an ankle injury). With a 3–1 lead over France, this resulted in Great Britain reaching their first Davis Cup semi-final since 1981.

Murray next participated at the Citi Open (for the first time since 2006), as the top seed and favourite to win the tournament. However, he suffered a defeat in his first match, losing to No. 53 Teymuraz Gabashvili in a final set tiebreak, despite serving for the match. In doubles, he partnered Daniel Nestor, however they lost in the first round to the fourth seeds, Rohan Bopanna and Florin Mergea, also in three sets.

He bounced back from this defeat by winning the Montreal Masters Rogers Cup, defeating Tsonga and Nishikori in the quarter-finals and semi-finals respectively. He then prevailed in the final against Djokovic in three sets. This broke his eight-match, two-year losing streak against Djokovic (his last win against him being in the final of Wimbledon in 2013). In winning the title he also surpassed Federer in terms of ranking, becoming the world No. 2 for the first time in over two years. In doubles, he partnered Leander Paes and they won their first match against Chardy and Anderson, but were then defeated by Murray's brother Jamie and John Peers in two sets – the first time the Murray brothers had competed against each other in a Tour-level match, a situation which Andy described as "awkward" and Jamie as "a bit weird".

In the second Master Series tournament of the US Hard Court season, the Cincinnati Masters, Murray defeated veteran Mardy Fish in the second round, and then beat both Grigor Dimitrov and Richard Gasquet in three-set matches, having to come from a set down on both occasions, while Dimitrov had served for the match in the deciding set. In the semi-final, he lost to defending champion Roger Federer in straight sets, and after Federer went on to win the tournament, this result saw Murray return to the No. 3 ranking and seeding for the US Open. At the US Open, Murray beat Nick Kyrgios in four sets before beating Adrian Mannarino in five sets after being two sets down, equaling Federer for winning eight matches from two sets to love down. He then beat Thomaz Bellucci in straight sets but suffered a defeat in the fourth round to Kevin Anderson in four sets. This ended Murray's five-year run of 18 consecutive Grand Slam quarter-finals (not counting his withdrawal from the 2013 French Open) since his third round loss to Stan Wawrinka in the 2010 US Open.

Playing against Australia in the semi-finals of the Davis Cup World Group in Glasgow, Murray won both his singles rubbers in straight sets, against Thanasi Kokkinakis and Bernard Tomic. He also partnered his brother Jamie, and they won in five sets against the pairing of Sam Groth and Lleyton Hewitt, the results guiding Great Britain to the Davis Cup final for the first time since 1978 with a 3–2 lead over Australia.

After losing in the semi-finals of the Shanghai Masters to Djokovic in straight sets, Murray reached the finals of the Paris Masters for the loss of just one set, with victories against Borna Ćorić, David Goffin and David Ferrer. After a three set win over Richard Gasquet, he joined Novak Djokovic, Roger Federer and Rafael Nadal as the only players to reach the semi-finals (or better) at all nine of the ATP World Tour Masters 1000 tournaments, and also ensured that he compiled his best match record in a single
season. He then lost the final to Djokovic again in straight sets.

As the world No. 2, Murray participated in the ATP World Tour Finals in London, and was drawn into the Ilie Năstase group with David Ferrer, Rafael Nadal and Stan Wawrinka. He went out in the round-robin stage, after defeating Ferrer and losing to Nadal and Wawrinka. However, after Federer failed to win the tournament, he finished the season ranked No. 2 for the first time.

In the Davis Cup final, Murray's victory over Ruben Bemelmans in straight sets pulled Great Britain level in the final after Kyle Edmund had lost the first singles rubber in five sets, played on indoor clay courts at Ghent. He then partnered his brother Jamie in a four-set victory over the pairing of Steve Darcis and David Goffin, before defeating Goffin again in the reverse singles on Sunday, thus ensuring a 3–1 victory for Great Britain, their first Davis Cup title since 1936 and their tenth overall. Murray also became only the third person since the current Davis Cup format was introduced to win all eight of his singles rubbers in a Davis Cup season, after John McEnroe and Mats Wilander.

2016: Second Wimbledon and Olympic Gold, and ascent to world No. 1

Murray began his 2016 season by playing in the Hopman Cup, pairing up with Heather Watson again. However, they finished second in their group after losing their tie to eventual champions Nick Kyrgios and Daria Gavrilova from Australia.

Murray played his first competitive tournament of 2016 at the Australian Open where he was aiming to win his first title there after four runner-up finishes. He went on to reach his fifth Australian Open final with victories over Alexander Zverev, Sam Groth, João Sousa, Bernard Tomic, David Ferrer and Milos Raonic, dropping four sets along the way. However, in a rematch of the previous year final, he was unable to win his first title as he lost in the final to an in-form Novak Djokovic (who won a record-equalling sixth title) in straight sets. He became the second man in the Open Era (after Ivan Lendl) to lose five Grand Slam finals at one event, and the only one not to have won the title. Subsequently, in February, Murray appointed Jamie Delgado as an assistant coach.

Murray then played at 2016 Davis Cup defeating Taro Daniel in straight sets and Kei Nishikori in five sets. Murray then competed at the first Masters 1000 of the year at the 2016 Indian Wells Masters. He defeated Marcel Granollers in the second round in straight sets but had an early loss to Federico Delbonis in the third round. Murray then played at the 2016 Miami Open as the 2nd seed. He defeated Denis Istomin in the second round in straight sets but had another early loss, to 26th seed Grigor Dimitrov, despite taking the first set.

Murray began his clay court season at the 2016 Monte-Carlo Rolex Masters as the 2nd seed. Murray struggled in his second round match against Pierre-Hugues Herbert but Murray came through in 3 sets. Murray struggled again in his third round match against 16th seed Benoît Paire as Murray was down a set and two breaks. Paire also served for the match in the third set but Murray still came through in 3 sets. Murray then defeated 10th seed Milos Raonic in straight sets in the quarter-finals. In the semi-finals, Murray lost to 5th seed and eventual champion Rafael Nadal despite winning the first set. Murray then played at the 2016 Mutua Madrid Open as the 2nd seed and the defending champion. Murray defeated qualifier Radek Štěpánek in three sets. He then proceeded to the semi-finals after defeating 16th seed Gilles Simon and 8th seed Tomáš Berdych both in straight sets. In the semi-finals, Murray defeated Nadal in straight sets who Murray had lost to earlier in the year. In the final Murray lost to number 1 seed Novak Djokovic in three sets. This loss dropped Murray from second to third in the ATP rankings. Shortly afterwards Mauresmo and Murray issued a joint statement announcing that they had "mutually agreed" to end their coaching partnership.

Murray regained his number two ranking after he won the 2016 Internazionali BNL d'Italia for his 1st title of the season and 36th overall. He defeated Mikhail Kukushkin, Jérémy Chardy, 12th seed David Goffin, Lucas Pouille, and number 1 seed Djokovic all in straight sets. This was his first win over Djokovic on clay and became the first British player since Virginia Wade in 1971 to win the title and the first British man since George Patrick Hughes in 1931. Murray then moved on to the French Open where he struggled in the opening rounds coming through two five-set matches against Štěpánek and French wildcard Mathias Bourgue. He came through in straight sets against big servers Ivo Karlović and John Isner to reach the quarter-finals where he beat home favourite Richard Gasquet in four sets to set up a semi-final clash against defending champion Stanislas Wawrinka. Murray defeated Wawrinka in four sets to become the first male British player since Bunny Austin in 1937, to reach a French Open final. He was unable to win his maiden French Open final, losing to Djokovic in four sets.

In June 2016, Ivan Lendl agreed to return to his former role as Murray's coach. Murray started his grass season at the 2016 Aegon Championships as the 1st seed and the defending champion. Murray defeated Nicolas Mahut in straight sets despite facing a set point in the first set and three set points in the second set. He then defeated his countryman Aljaž Bedene in straight sets. He then had three set wins over Kyle Edmund, another countryman, and No. 5 seed Marin Čilić. In the final he was down a set and a break to 3rd seed Milos Raonic. Murray still managed to come back and win a record 5th Queen's Club Championships and it was also his 2nd title in 2016. Murray then played at the third major of the year at the 2016 Wimbledon Championships as the 2nd seed. Murray had straight set wins over Liam Broady, Lu Yen-hsun, John Millman, and Nick Kyrgios in the first four rounds. Murray then defeated 12th seed Jo-Wilfried Tsonga in five sets in the quarter-final and 10th seed Tomáš Berdych in straight sets to reach his third straight major final. In the final on 10 July, Murray defeated Raonic in straight sets to win his second Wimbledon title and third major title overall. His Wimbledon crown was his 3rd title of the season and 38th career Tour title.

Murray next played at the Rio Olympic Games. He became the first player, male or female, to win two consecutive gold medals in the tennis singles events by defeating Juan Martín del Potro in the final, which lasted over four hours.  The win was his 3rd consecutive title and 4th title of the season. Murray then entered the US Open and beat Lukas Rosol, Marcel Granollers, Paolo Lorenzi and Grigor Dimitrov in the first four rounds. However, his run came to an end when he lost to sixth seed Kei Nishikori in five sets despite holding a two sets to one lead.

His next activity was the 2016 Davis Cup semi-final in Glasgow against Argentina. He lost the opening rubber against Juan Martín del Potro in five sets. After Great Britain lost the second rubber as well, he teamed up with his brother Jamie to beat del Potro and Leonardo Mayer in the third rubber in four sets. He then won the fourth rubber against Guido Pella in straight sets, though Great Britain eventually lost the tie. Murray then won the China Open for his fifth title of 2016 and 40th career tour title. He defeated Andreas Seppi, Andrey Kuznetsov, Kyle Edmund, David Ferrer, and Grigor Dimitrov all in straight sets. Murray then backed this up with a tournament win at the Shanghai Rolex Masters defeating Steve Johnson, Lucas Pouille, David Goffin, Gilles Simon, and Roberto Bautista Agut all in straight sets to capture his 13th masters title and 3rd title in Shanghai. This marked his 6th title of 2016 and drew him even with former No. 1 Stefan Edberg at No. 15 on the Open Era titles list with 41 Tour titles each.

Murray brought his win streak to 15 consecutive match wins by winning the Erste Bank Open for his seventh tour title of the 2016 season.  His tournament started slowly with three-set wins over Martin Klizan and Gilles Simon in the first two rounds. However, a decisive win over John Isner in the quarter-final and a walkover due to David Ferrer's withdrawal with a leg injury saw Murray reach the final. There he defeated Jo-Wilfried Tsonga, for his third title in succession. The result saw Murray win seven titles in a single season for the first time in his career, and move to solo 15th on the all-time list of singles titles in the Open Era, breaking a tie with former world No. 1 Stefan Edberg.

Murray entered the Paris Masters knowing that in the event of Djokovic not reaching the final, winning the title would be enough to see him crowned world No. 1 for the first time. After reaching the quarter-finals, courtesy of wins over Fernando Verdasco and Lucas Pouille, Murray faced Berdych for a place in the semi-finals, winning in straight sets. Meanwhile, Djokovic lost to Marin Cilic, meaning that Murray would replace Djokovic at the top of the rankings should he reach the final. He was due to face Milos Raonic in the semi-finals. However, Raonic withdrew before the start of the match, giving Murray a walkover. As a result, Murray became the first British man to reach No. 1 since the introduction of the rankings in 1973. Murray then defeated John Isner in the final in 3 sets to win his fourth consecutive tournament and first Paris Masters title. In November 2016, Murray reached the final of the ATP World Tour Finals for the first time before winning against Novak Djokovic in two sets, thus reaching year-end No. 1 and in doing so, becoming the first player to win a Grand Slam, the ATP World Tour Finals, the men's singles at the Olympic Games and a Masters 1000 title in the same calendar year. The International Tennis Federation recognised Murray as their men's 2016 ITF men's world champion, the first time Murray had achieved this honour.

2017: Struggles with form and injury, and hiatus

Murray was knighted in the 2017 New Year Honours for services to tennis and charity, making him the UK's youngest knight, at 29. He opened the season with a loss in the semi-finals of the Mubadala World Tennis Championship to David Goffin, following which he won against Milos Raonic in the third-place play-off. Murray then reached the final of the Qatar Open, but lost to Novak Djokovic in three sets despite saving three championship points. At the Australian Open he lost in the fourth round against Mischa Zverev in four sets.

Murray returned to action at the Dubai Duty Free Tennis Championships event in February. There he won his only tournament of the year, beating Fernando Verdasco in straight sets, despite almost losing in the quarter-finals to Philipp Kohlschreiber where Murray had to save seven match points. The next week, he suffered a shock defeat in the second round of the Indian Wells Masters to Vasek Pospisil.

After missing a month due to an elbow injury, Murray returned to compete in the Monte-Carlo Masters in April, losing out in the third round to Albert Ramos-Vinolas. He then competed in Barcelona where he was beaten by Dominic Thiem in the semi-finals. Murray continued to struggle in his next two tournaments, losing to Borna Coric in the third round of Madrid, and to Fabio Fognini in second round of Rome, where he was defending champion. In both of these defeats, he failed to win a set. At the 2017 French Open, following tough four-set victories over Andrey Kuznetsov and Martin Kližan in the opening rounds, Murray defeated Juan Martín del Potro and Karen Khachanov in straight sets. In the quarter-finals he defeated Kei Nishikori in four sets, but lost in the semi-finals to Stan Wawrinka in five sets.

As the five-time champion at Queens, Murray pledged his prize money to the victims of the Grenfell Tower fire, however he was defeated in straight sets by Jordan Thompson in the first round. Despite concerns over a lingering hip injury, he returned to Wimbledon as the defending champion and progressed to the third round with straight set wins against Alexander Bublik and Dustin Brown. He dropped his first set of the tournament to Fabio Fognini but proceeded to the fourth round in four sets. Murray continued to the quarter final with a straight set victory against Benoit Paire. However, he was defeated in the quarter-final by Sam Querrey in five sets.

Murray missed the Canadian Open and the Cincinnati Masters due to his hip injury, which led to him losing his No. 1 ranking to Rafael Nadal. His injury then forced him to withdraw from the 2017 US Open two days before the start of the tournament, making it the first Grand Slam tournament he had missed since the 2013 French Open. Murray then withdrew from the Asian hard court swing and said it was "most likely" that he would not play in a professional tournament again in 2017. Ultimately he did indeed not play again, withdrawing from Paris which left him unable to qualify for the 2017 ATP Finals; that November, as a result of his inactivity, his ranking fell sharply to No. 16, his lowest ranking since May 2008. Murray returned to the court to play a charity match against Federer in Glasgow and expressed his hope to return to the tour in Brisbane. The following week, he and Ivan Lendl announced that they had mutually ended their coaching arrangement for a second time.

2018: Hip surgery, out of top 800, and return to tour
Murray withdrew from the Brisbane International and Australian Open due to hip injury. In a post on Instagram, Murray explained that rehab was one option for recovery. He added that hip surgery was also an option but that the chances of a successful outcome were not as high. On 8 January, Murray announced on Instagram he had undergone hip surgery.

In March, Murray lost his British No. 1 ranking for the first time since 2006, to Kyle Edmund. Later that month, Murray said he was making progress after several days of playing at the Mouratoglou Academy in Nice after posting pictures of himself practising against Aidan McHugh, a British junior player, on Instagram. He then announced he would play his first ATP tournament since hip surgery at the Rosmalen Grass Court Championships in June, although he later withdrew saying he was not quite ready and wanted to be 100%. However, he later announced he would make his return at the Queen's Club Championships. He subsequently lost to Nick Kyrgios in the first round in three sets. He was given a wildcard for the Eastbourne International, where he beat Stan Wawrinka in the first round before losing to Kyle Edmund in the second. He withdrew from Wimbledon with a "heavy heart" a day before the tournament, saying it was too soon to play five-set matches. As a result of this withdrawal, he dropped to 839th in the ATP rankings, his newest low ranking since he first entered the ATP rankings on 21 July 2003.

He then entered the Washington Open, where he won his first round match against Mackenzie McDonald in three sets. He then faced Kyle Edmund, who had dealt him his last defeat at Eastbourne, overcoming him in three sets. His next match, a dramatic three-set victory over Marius Copil in the third round, lasted until just past 3:00 AM local time; Murray wept after the conclusion of the match, overcome with emotion. He then withdrew from the tournament and the Canadian Open the following week to continue his recovery and to focus on the Cincinnati Masters for which he was awarded a wildcard. He eventually lost in the first round to France's Lucas Pouille in three sets.

Murray made his grand slam return at the US Open where he defeated the Australian James Duckworth in four sets. However, he was unable to progress further, losing in the second round to Spain's Fernando Verdasco in four sets.

Murray then withdrew from Great Britain's Davis Cup tie against Uzbekistan in Glasgow to continue his rehabilitation from his injury.

He entered the Shenzhen Open as a wildcard. He advanced to the second round after Zhizhen Zhang retired in the third set of the first round. There, he faced defending champion and top seed David Goffin, who Murray upset in straight sets. He then faced Fernando Verdasco in the quarter-finals, but was defeated in straight sets. Murray had been due to play at the China Open the following week, but, after suffering a slight ankle problem, he decided to end his season early to ensure he would be fit for the following year.

2019: Second hip surgery, comeback, and first title in two years
Murray travelled to Brisbane early in order to better prepare for the Brisbane International. He won his first round match against James Duckworth in straight sets but admitted post-match that he did not know how long he would be able to play top-class tennis. Murray was defeated in the next round by Daniil Medvedev, at that time ranked 16th in the world.

On 11 January 2019, at a press conference just before the 2019 Australian Open, an emotional Murray announced that he could possibly retire from professional tennis due to struggling physically for a "long time", particularly with his hip injury. He said that he had been suffering with hip pain on a daily basis, and that it caused him to struggle with tasks like putting his shoes and socks on. He spoke of the possibility of a second hip surgery, but expressed doubt this would be a viable option to prolong his career, merely allowing him to "have a better quality of life, and be out of pain". He hoped to make it through to Wimbledon, but that the Australian Open could be his final tournament if he was not able to last until the summer, stating: "I'm not sure I can play through the pain for another four or five months". Active and retired tennis players, including Juan Martín del Potro, Kyle Edmund, Bilie Jean King and the other members of the 'Big Four' paid tribute to Murray upon his announcement.

Murray entered the singles of the Australian Open, however lost his opening match against 22nd seed Roberto Bautista Agut in a four-hour, five-set 'epic'. At its conclusion, a video montage of tributes featuring other top players Roger Federer, Novak Djokovic, Sloane Stephens and Caroline Wozniacki played in deference to his impending retirement. In his post-match interview, he stated that he was considering a second hip surgery, and had not yet ruled out a return to the sport upon recovering from the operation.

Bob Bryan urged Murray to have the "Birmingham hip (BHR)" operation he underwent in August 2018, involving a cobalt-chrome metal cap being placed over the femur with a matching metal cup in the acetabulum (a conservative bone-saving alternative to a traditional Total Hip Replacement). Bryan informed Murray that the BHR would improve his quality of life and may help him return to the professional tennis tour. On 29 January, Murray announced on Instagram that he had undergone hip resurfacing surgery in London and hoped that it would "be the end of my hip pain." On 4 February, in an interview with The Times, Professor Derek McMinn, who invented the BHR implant and procedure, gave the opinion that Murray's chances of returning to competitive tennis should be "in the high 90 per cent". On 7 March, Murray stated in an interview that he was now free of pain in his hip as a result of the surgery and may therefore return to playing competitive tennis, but that any potential Wimbledon return would be dependent on how his hip felt, and that he would not rush his comeback and may test his condition by playing doubles.

On 16 May 2019, Murray received his knighthood from Prince Charles at Buckingham Palace, two years after he was awarded the honour.

Murray returned to the professional tennis circuit in June, entering the doubles competition of the Queen's Club Championships alongside Feliciano Lopez. The duo won their first round match against the top seeds Juan Sebastián Cabal and Robert Farah in straight sets and then beat the defending champions John Peers and Henri Kontinen in the semi finals. Murray and Lopez went on to win the tournament by defeating Rajeev Ram and Joe Salisbury in a final set champions tiebreak. Following the win, Murray stated that his "hip felt great" and that "there was no pain." Murray continued his comeback from injury by partnering Marcelo Melo in the doubles at the Eastbourne International where they lost in the first round against Cabal and Farah. At the 2019 Wimbledon Championships, Murray entered the men's doubles and mixed doubles events. In the men's doubles he partnered Pierre-Hugues Herbert and was eliminated in the second round, while his mixed doubles partnership with Serena Williams ended with a third round defeat to top seeds Bruno Soares and Nicole Melichar.

After Murray's Wimbledon campaign, he and his brother Jamie participated in the Citi Open doubles, where they defeated Edouard Roger-Vasselin and Nicolas Mahut before losing to Michael Venus and Raven Klaasen in the round of 16. His next tournament at the Canadian Open renewed his partnership with Feliciano Lopez where they defeated Lukasz Kubot and Marcelo Melo and lost to Fabrice Martin and Jeremy Chardy. Following the conclusion of the tournament, Murray stated his return to the singles competition at the Western and Southern Open and revealed his plans to play in China in the autumn.

In his first singles match since the 2019 Australian Open, Murray faced Richard Gasquet in the first round of the 2019 Cincinnati Masters, losing in straight sets. In the quarter-final of the Cincinnati doubles tournament, Andy Murray and Feliciano López met Jamie Murray and Neal Skupski in only the second match between the siblings in their senior careers; Jamie and Skupski won in three sets to progress, with Andy stating afterwards that he would now concentrate his efforts on returning to the singles tour. Murray then played at the 2019 Winston-Salem Open, where he faced Tennys Sandgren in the first round. Murray lost in straight sets, though the score was close. Murray then contemplated dropping down to Challenger level, skipping the US Open entirely to focus on two tournaments happening concurrently. Murray opted to play at the 2019 Rafa Nadal Open Banc Sabadell Challenger event, the first time he had competed on the second tier Challenger Tour since 2005. In the first round of the event, Murray defeated 17-year-old Imran Sibille in straight sets in under 43 minutes to record his first singles victory since his hip surgery. He lost to Matteo Viola in the third round.

In September 2019, Murray participated in the inaugural Zhuhai Championships, losing to eventual champion Alex de Minaur in the second round. He also participated in the China Open, where he recorded a win against Matteo Berrettini, ranked 13th in the world, but he was eliminated by eventual champion Dominic Thiem in the quarter-final. Murray lost against 12th ranked Fabio Fognini in the second round of the Shanghai Open, before winning the first title after his operation in the European Open in October 2019, beating three-time Grand Slam winner Stan Wawrinka in the final. In November 2019, he represented Great Britain for the first time since 2016 after being named in the squad for the 2019 Davis Cup finals; however, he was only able to play one rubber in Great Britain's run to the semi-finals.

At the end of November 2019, a television documentary, Andy Murray: Resurfacing, was released on the Amazon Prime platform, detailing Murray's various attempts to overcome his hip injury over a two-year period from his defeat at Wimbledon in 2017 to his doubles victory at Queen's Club in 2019. In late December, Murray's team confirmed that the pelvic injury which had curtailed his involvement in the Davis Cup would also prevent him from entering the upcoming 2020 Australian Open and the inaugural ATP Cup.

2020: First top 10 win in three years
Due to the COVID-19 pandemic, numerous tournaments on the 2020 ATP Tour were either cancelled or rescheduled for later in the year. 
Murray's first ATP tournament of 2020 was at the Western & Southern Open in August in which he entered as a wildcard. He beat Frances Tiafoe in the first round before beating world No. 7 Alexander Zverev in the second, his first victory over a top-10 player in over three years and the 102nd of his career. He lost his third round match to Milos Raonic in straight sets.

In his first round match at the spectator-less US Open Murray came back from two down to narrowly defeat Yoshihito Nishioka of Japan in five sets. Then in the second round he lost in straight sets to the 15th seed Felix Auger-Aliassime of Canada.

He then entered the French Open as a wildcard but was defeated in the first round in straight sets by Stan Wawrinka.

Murray's last tournament of the year was the Bett1Hulks Indoors where he received a wildcard into the main draw and lost in the first round to Fernando Verdasco in straight sets. He did not enter the European Open and thus failed to defend his title.

2021: Wimbledon third round
Murray was due to start his season at the 2021 Australian Open again as a wildcard but this was put in doubt after testing positive for COVID-19 on 14 January. On 22 January, it was confirmed that he would miss the Australian Open due to not being able to find a workable quarantine after his positive test.

His first tournament of the season was the 2021 Open Sud de France where, as a wildcard, he lost in the first round.  After that in March, he competed at the 2021 ABN AMRO World Tennis Tournament in Rotterdam as a wildcard where he lost in the second round against Andrey Rublev.

Murray was largely inactive during the next three months due to a groin injury, managing only two match appearances in doubles at the Italian Open in May. This left his ranking too low for a direct entry for the French Open. He decided against entering qualifying or trying to earn a wild card in order to focus on the upcoming grass court season.

He returned to singles play as a wildcard at the Queen's Club Championships where he defeated Benoît Paire in the first round but lost in the second to the 1st seed, Matteo Berrettini, in straight sets.

At Wimbledon he received a wildcard. He lost in the third round to Denis Shapovalov, after defeating 24th seed Nikoloz Basilashvili and qualifier Oscar Otte.

Murray entered into the men's singles and men's doubles at the 2020 Summer Olympics as the two-time defending champion. Murray was drawn against world no. 15 Canadian Félix Auger-Aliassime, but he withdrew before his first-round singles match due to a quadriceps strain, electing to remain in the doubles match. Murray was replaced by Australian Max Purcell, who went on to defeat Auger-Aliassime. Murray, along with partner Joe Salisbury, reached the quarter-finals of the men's doubles event before losing to the Croatian pair and eventual silver medallists Marin Čilić and Ivan Dodig, after defeating French pair Nicolas Mahut and Pierre-Hugues Herbert in the first round, and German pair Kevin Krawietz and Tim Pütz in the second.

Murray played two events on the US circuit. At the 2021 Western & Southern Open, Murray won as a wildcard in straight sets against Richard Gasquet before losing to Hubert Hurkacz in the second round. At the 2021 Winston-Salem Open, Murray entered as a wildcard again and won in straight sets against Noah Rubin (a replacement for Nick Kyrgios who withdrew shortly before the start of the match), in the first round, before losing to Frances Tiafoe in the second. At the US Open, he lost to Stefanos Tsitsipas in five sets in the first round. The match was controversial, with Murray accusing Tsitsipas of cheating, in reference to an eight-minute bathroom break that was had by Tsitsipas during the match.

Murray subsequently entered the 2021 Open de Rennes, an event on the ATP Challenger Tour after accepting a wildcard. He defeated Yannick Maden in the first round in straight sets, but lost in three sets to Roman Safiullin. Murray then reached the quarterfinal of the Moselle Open as a wildcard only losing out to the eventual champion and top seed, Poland's Hubert Hurkacz. Murray lost also as a wildcard in the round of 16 to the 2nd seed and eventual champion Casper Ruud at the 2021 San Diego Open. He received another wildcard for the Indian Wells Masters, where he reached the third round and was beaten by Alexander Zverev. He then reached the second round of the European Open as a wildcard after a 3-hour and 45 minute marathon win against Frances Tiafoe. He lost in the second round to Diego Schwartzman in straight sets.
At the Vienna Open, Murray entered as a wildcard and upset 5th seed and world No. 10 Hubert Hurkacz in the first round in three sets to claim the 103rd top 10 victory of his career and the first of the year, but fell in straight sets to Carlos Alcaraz the following round. At the 2021 Stockholm Open, he reached the quarterfinals as a wildcard, defeating top seed and World No. 10 Jannik Sinner for his second top 10 win in two weeks and for the season and the 104th in his career.

2022: First ATP final since 2019, 700th match win and return to top 50

Murray entered the 2021 Mubadala World Tennis Championship, an exhibition tournament held in Abu Dhabi in December. After defeating Dan Evans in straight sets, he met Rafael Nadal for their first match since the semi-finals of the 2016 Madrid Open. He beat Nadal in straight sets. Murray lost the final match in straight sets and a tiebreak to Andrey Rublev.

After a first round loss as a wildcard at the Melbourne Summer Set to Facundo Bagnis, Murray reached the final as a wildcard at the Sydney Tennis Classic, beating Viktor Durasovic in the first round and second seed Nikoloz Basilashvili in the second round in a match lasting over 3 hours. After his quarterfinal opponent, 8th seed David Goffin retired due to injury, he beat Reilly Opelka in the semifinals before falling to Aslan Karatsev in the final.

Murray participated in the 2022 Australian Open as a wildcard . Murray met Nikoloz Basilashvili for the second time in the space of a week, and won the first round in five sets. He lost in the second round, in straight sets against Taro Daniel.

Having decided to end his trial period with new coach Jan de Witt, Murray received a wildcard to play at the 2022 Rotterdam Open. He beat Alexander Bublik in the first round, and lost to Félix Auger-Aliassime in the second. He also hired Dani Vallverdu as his replacement coach. Murray entered the 2022 Qatar Open as a wildcard, and, in a rematch of the second round of the Australian open, met Taro Daniel, who he defeated in straight sets. Murray lost his second-round match to second seed Roberto Bautista Agut 6–0 6–1, being served a bagel for the first time since his loss to Novak Djokovic at the 2015 Miami Open final.

After Qatar, Murray entered the 2022 Dubai Tennis Championships as a wildcard , looking to secure his first win at the event in five years. He beat Christopher O'Connell, but lost to Jannik Sinner in straight sets. After his stint with Vallverdu ended, Murray re-hired Ivan Lendl as his coach, who he had worked with twice before. 

In March, Murray entered the 2022 Indian Wells Masters as a wildcard, meeting Taro Daniel in the first round, in their third meeting in 2022. He beat Daniel in three sets, marking his 700th win overall, but lost in the second round to Alexander Bublik in straight sets.
Moving onto the 2022 Miami Open as a wildcard, Murray beat Federico Delbonis in straight sets. He lost in straight sets to top seed and world no. 2 Daniil Medvedev in the second round. 

Although Murray had originally stated in February that he is planning to skip the Spring clay season, he later changed his mind and accepted a wildcard into the 2022 Madrid Open in April. At the 2022 Madrid Open Murray beat Dominic Thiem and Denis Shapovalov in the first two rounds to set up a clash against Novak Djokovic for the first time in five years. Murray later withdrew from the match due to a stomach illness, giving Djokovic a walkover.

Murray's first tournament back was the challenger tournament in Surbiton, where he reached the semifinals before losing to Denis Kudla in 3 sets. Murray then played in Stuttgart, where after beating Chris O'Connell and 7th seed Alexander Bublik, Murray won his first match against a top 5 player since 2016 by beating top seed and world no. 5 Stefanos Tsitsipas in straight sets. He then beat Nick Kyrgios in straight sets to reach the final, where he lost to Matteo Berrettini in 3 sets. As a result, Murray's ranking rose to no. 47, entering the top 50 for the first time since 2018. However, an injury sustained during the final forced him to withdraw from the Queen’s Club Championships. 

At Wimbledon, Murray beat James Duckworth in four sets in the first round, before losing in the second round to 20th seed John Isner, in four sets. After Wimbledon, he entered the Hall of Fame Open, where he reached the quarterfinal before losing in straight sets to the third seed, Alexander Bublik.

Murray's American hard court swing began with a first-round loss at the Citi Open to Mikael Ymer, as well as another first-round loss to Taylor Fritz, at the Canadian Open as a wildcard. For the first time since 2005, Murray entered a qualifying tournament for the Cincinnati Masters. However, thanks to a Special Exempt spot being withdrawn from the tournament, Murray was moved to the main draw, where he entered the second round by defeating Stan Wawrinka in three sets. In the second round, Murray lost to Cameron Norrie in three sets.

At the 2022 US Open he lost in the third round to Matteo Berrettini.

2023: Longest career match, Record wildcards
At the Australian Open, Murray reached the third round after 5-set victories against 13th seed Matteo Berrettini and Thanasi Kokkinakis. His match against Kokkinakis lasted 5 hours and 45 minutes, the longest in Murray's career up until this point. He lost to 24th seed Roberto Bautista Agut in the third round in 4 sets.

He received wildcards for the 2023 Qatar ExxonMobil Open in Doha and the 2023 Dubai Tennis Championships equaling the record of 53, for most wildcards received for a player since 1990, of former player Tommy Haas, who retired in 2017.

Rivalries

Murray vs. Djokovic 

Novak Djokovic and Murray have met 36 times with Djokovic leading 25–11. Djokovic leads 5–1 on clay, 20–8 on hard courts, and Murray leads 2–0 on grass. The two are almost exactly the same age, with Murray being only a week older than Djokovic. They went to training camp together, and Murray won the first match they ever played as teenagers. The pair have met 19 times in finals, with Djokovic leading 11–8. Ten of the finals were at ATP Masters 1000 events, and they are tied at 5–5. They have met in seven major finals: The 2011 Australian Open, the 2012 US Open, the 2013 Australian Open, the 2013 Wimbledon Championships, the 2015 Australian Open, the 2016 Australian Open, and the 2016 French Open. Djokovic won in Australia four times and at the French Open, Murray emerged as the victor at the US Open and Wimbledon. The former of Murray's victories was the longest ever final at the US Open, tying with the 1988 final played between Ivan Lendl and Mats Wilander at 4 hours and 53 minutes, while the latter was notable for being the first home triumph in men's singles at Wimbledon since 1936.

They also played a nearly five-hour-long semifinal match in the 2012 Australian Open, in which Djokovic won 7–5 in the fifth set after Murray led 2 sets to 1. Murray and Djokovic met again in 2012 at the London 2012 Olympic Games, with Murray winning in straight sets. During the final of the 2012 Shanghai Masters, Murray held five championship points in the second set, however Djokovic saved each of them, forcing a deciding set. He eventually prevailed to win his first Shanghai Masters title, ending Murray's 12–match winning streak at the event. The three set matches they played in Rome and Shanghai in 2011 and 2012 respectively were voted the ATP World Tour Match of the Year for each respective season. Due to the tight competition between 2008 and 2013, many saw this as the emerging rivalry. Djokovic went on to dominate the rivalry after the 2013 Wimbledon final, winning 13 of their last 16 matches. In 2016, Murray suffered his 4th loss (his 5th total) in the final of the Australian Open from Djokovic, followed by another defeat in the Roland Garros final, where Djokovic won his first Roland Garros title and completed the Career Grand Slam. Murray and Djokovic met in the final at the year's end final of the ATP World Tour Finals for the first time in their rivalry, where the winner would be granted the year-end No. 1 status. Djokovic dropped only one set en route to the final, but lost in straight sets to Murray, who finished the year at No. 1 and became the first British player to achieve this feat.

Murray vs. Federer 
Murray and Roger Federer have met 25 times with Federer leading 14–11. Federer leads 12–10 on hard courts and 2–1 on grass, having never met on clay. They have met six times at the Grand Slam tournament level, with Federer leading 5–1. After Federer won the first professional match they played, Murray dominated the first half of the rivalry, with an 8–5 lead in 2010. The second half of the rivalry has been dominated by Federer, who leads 9–3 since 2011, and has led their rivalry since the 2014 ATP World Tour Finals. Federer leads 5–3 in finals, having won each of their Grand Slam Final meetings at the 2008 US Open and 2010 Australian Open, both of which Federer won in straight sets, and the 2012 Wimbledon Championships, where Murray took the first set, but ended up losing in 4 sets. Murray leads 6–3 in ATP 1000 tournaments and 2–0 in finals. They have met five times at the ATP World Tour Finals, with Murray winning in Shanghai in 2008 and Federer coming out victorious in London in 2009, 2010, 2012, and in 2014.

In August 2012, Murray met Federer in the final of the London 2012 Olympics at Wimbledon Centre Court, just four weeks after the 2012 Wimbledon Final, in which Federer had defeated Murray to win his record-tying 7th title at the All-England Club. Murray defeated Federer in straight sets to win the gold medal, denying Federer a Career Golden Slam. In 2013 Murray beat Federer for the first time in a major in the semi-finals of the Australian Open, prevailing in five sets after Federer had come back twice from a set down. Their last grand slam meeting was at the 2015 Wimbledon Championships semi-finals, where a dominant Federer defeated Murray in straight sets, earning a place in his 10th Wimbledon final. Murray is one of only three players to have recorded 10 or more victories over Federer, the other two being Nadal and Djokovic. Their most recent meeting took place at the 2015 Cincinnati Masters semi-finals, with Federer winning the match in two close sets, recording his fifth consecutive victory over Murray.

Murray vs. Nadal 
Murray has played against Rafael Nadal on 24 occasions since 2007, with Nadal leading 17–7. Nadal leads 7–2 on clay, 3–0 on grass and 7–5 on hard courts. The pair regularly meet at Grand Slam level, with nine out of their twenty-four meetings coming in slams, with Nadal leading 7–2 (3–0 at Wimbledon, 2–0 at the French Open, 1–1 at the Australian Open and 1–1 at the US Open). Eight of these nine appearances have been at quarter-final and semi-final level. They have never met in a slam final, however, Murray leads 3–1 in ATP finals, with Nadal winning at Indian Wells in 2009 and Murray winning in Rotterdam the same year, Tokyo in 2011, and at Madrid in 2015.

Murray lost three consecutive Grand Slam semi-finals to Nadal in 2011 from the French Open to the US Open. The pair had not met for three years since the final of the 2011 Japan Open until the quarter-finals of the 2014 Rome Masters, although they were scheduled to meet in the semi-final of the 2012 Miami Masters before Nadal withdrew injured. At the semi-final stage of the 2014 French Open, Nadal triumphed in a dominant straight sets win for the loss of just 6 games. In one of their most recent meetings, Murray beat Nadal for the first time on clay, and the first time in a Masters 1000 final, at the Madrid Open in 2015. Murray fell to Nadal in the semi-finals of the 2016 Monte Carlo Masters, despite taking the first set. Three weeks later they met again at the semi-final stage of the 2016 Madrid Open, this time Murray winning the match in straight sets.

Murray vs. Wawrinka 
Murray and Stan Wawrinka have played 22 times with Murray leading 13–9. Murray leads 9–4 on hard courts and 3–0 on grass courts while Wawrinka leads 5–1 on clay courts. They have also met seven times in Grand Slam tournaments with Wawrinka holding a slight 4–3 edge. They have contested some close matches and one of their most notable meetings was in the 2009 Wimbledon fourth round, which Murray won in five sets; this was the first men's match to be played under the Wimbledon roof, having the latest finish for a Wimbledon match at the time. Wawrinka also ended Murray's title defence at the 2013 US Open quarter-finals with a comfortable straight sets victory. Other close matches between the two include three-set wins for Murray at the 2008 Canada Open and 2011 Shanghai Masters, and the 2010 US Open which Wawrinka won in four sets.

While Murray has led the majority of the rivalry, Wawrinka won their first two matches and beat Murray three times in succession between 2013 and 2015, winning all of them in straight sets, until Murray ended the losing streak at the 2016 French Open, beating defending champion Wawrinka in four sets to reach his first-ever French Open final. Around this time Wawrinka was identified by some, including Djokovic, as a potential contender to turn the Big Four tennis quartet into a "Big Five", although Wawrinka himself downplayed those suggestions, stating that he was still far behind the others. Their most recent match in a major was in the first round of the 2020 French Open, which Wawrinka won in straight sets. However, in the first round of the 2022 Cincinnati Masters, Murray won in three tight sets.

Playing style 

Murray plays an all-court game with an emphasis on defensive baseline play, and in 2009 professional tennis coach Paul Annacone stated that Murray "may be the best counterpuncher on tour today." His strengths include groundstrokes with low error rate, the ability to anticipate and react, and his transition from defence to offence with speed, which enables him to hit winners from defensive positions. Murray also has one of the best two-handed backhands on the tour, with dynamic stroke execution while he primarily uses his forehand, which is more passive, and a sliced backhand to let opponents play into his defensive game before playing more offensively. Tim Henman stated in 2013 that Murray may have the best lob in the game, succeeding Lleyton Hewitt. Murray's tactics often involve passive exchanges from the baseline. He is capable of injecting sudden pace into his groundstrokes to surprise his opponents who are used to the slow rally. Murray is also one of the top returners in the game, often able to block back fast serves with his excellent reach and ability to anticipate. For this reason, Murray is rarely aced.

Murray is known for being one of the most intelligent tacticians on the court, often constructing points. Other strengths in his game, although not huge parts of his game, include his drop shot and net game. As he plays predominantly from the baseline, he usually approaches the net to volley when finishing points more quickly. Murray is most proficient on a fast surface, like grass, where he has won eight singles titles including the Wimbledon Championships and the 2012 Olympic Gold Medal, although hard courts are his preferred surface. He has worked hard since 2008 on improving his clay court game, ultimately winning his first clay titles during 2015 at Munich and Madrid, as well as reaching his first French Open final during 2016. While Murray's serve is a major weapon for him, with his first serve reaching speeds of 130 mph or higher on some occasions and winning him many free points, it can become inconsistent when hit under pressure, especially with a more vulnerable and slower second serve. Since the 2011 season, under Ivan Lendl's coaching, Murray has played a more offensive game and has also worked to improve his second serve, forehand, consistency and mental game which have all been crucial to his further success.

Endorsements and equipment 
In 2009, German manufacturer Adidas and Murray signed a five-year-deal worth £30 million. This included wearing their range of tennis shoes. The contract with Adidas allowed Murray to keep his shirt sleeve sponsors Shiatzy Chen, Royal Bank of Scotland and Highland Spring. Before he was signed by Adidas in late 2009, he wore Fred Perry apparel. At the end of their contract together Adidas decided not to re-sign with Murray, and he began a 4-year partnership with athletic apparel company Under Armour in December 2014, reportedly worth $25 million. Murray signed with Castore for the 2019 season which Murray called his last deal before announcing his retirement.

Murray uses Head rackets, and regularly appears in advertisements for the brand. He endorses the Head Radical Pro model, whereas his actual playing racket (underneath the various Radical Pro paintjobs) is reported to be a customized pro stock PT57A, derived from the original Pro Tour 630 model, but with a 16×19 string pattern. The racquet used to be set up extremely heavy at the beginning of his career, but after a 2007 wrist injury its weight was lowered.

In June 2012, the Swiss watch manufacturer Rado announced that Murray had signed a deal to wear their D-Star 200 model.

Coaches 
Murray's coach has changed through the years, as follows: Leon Smith (1998–2004), Pato Álvarez (2003–2005), Mark Petchey (2005–2006), Brad Gilbert (2006–2007), Miles Maclagan (2007–2010), Àlex Corretja (2010–2011), Ivan Lendl (2011–2014, 2016–2017, 2022–), Jonas Björkman (2015), Jamie Delgado (2016–2021). In 2022 he was coached for a short while by Dani Vallverdu; Ivan Lendl has been his coach since March 2022.

Charitable work 
Murray is a founding member of the Malaria No More UK Leadership Council and helped launch the charity in 2009 with David Beckham. Footage from the launch at Wembley Stadium can be seen on YouTube and the charity's website.  Murray also made 'Nets Needed', a short public service announcement, for the charity to help raise awareness and funds to help in the fight against malaria. Murray has also taken part in several charity tennis events, including the Rally for Relief events that took place before the start of the 2011 Australian Open.

In June 2013, Murray teamed up with former British No. 1 Tim Henman for a charity doubles match against Murray's coach and eight-time grand slam champion Ivan Lendl, and No. 6 Tomáš Berdych at the Queen's Club in London. The event named Rally Against Cancer was organised to raise money for Royal Marsden Cancer Charity after his best friend and fellow British player Ross Hutchins was diagnosed with Hodgkin's lymphoma. The event took place following the final day of competitive play at the AEGON Championships, on Sunday 16 June. Subsequently, following his victory at the tournament, Murray donated his entire prize money pot to The Royal Marsden Cancer Charity.

In June 2014, following the death of Elena Baltacha due to liver cancer, Murray featured in an event known as 'Rally for Bally'. Murray played at Queen's Club alongside Victoria Azarenka, Martina Hingis, Heather Watson and his brother Jamie. The event raised money for the Royal Marsden Cancer Charity and the Elena Baltacha Academy of Tennis. Children from Baltacha's academy took to the court to play alongside Murray. As a result of his various charitable exploits, Murray was awarded the Arthur Ashe Humanitarian of the Year award for 2014.

Image

National identity 
 
Murray identifies himself as "Scottish, but also British". His national identity has often been commented on by the media. While making a cameo appearance on the comedy show Outnumbered, Murray was asked whether he was British or Scottish, to which he responded "Depends whether I win or not." Much of the discussion about Murray's national identity began before Wimbledon 2006, when he was quoted as saying he would "support whoever England is playing" at the 2006 World Cup. English ex-tennis player Tim Henman confirmed that the remarks had been made in jest and were only in response to Murray being teased by journalist Des Kelly and Henman about Scotland's failure to qualify.

Murray initially refused to endorse either side of the debate in the 2014 referendum on Scottish independence, citing the abuse he had received after his England-World Cup comments in 2006. Just before the referendum, Murray tweeted a message that was considered by the media to be supportive of independence. He received online abuse for expressing his opinion, including messages that were described as "vile" by Police Scotland; one referred to the Dunblane massacre. A few days after the vote, in which a 55% majority opposed Scottish independence, Murray said that he did not regret stating his view, but said that it was out of character and that he would concentrate on his tennis career in the future.

Victory salute 

After defeating Nikolay Davydenko at Wimbledon 2012, Murray pointed upwards with both hands and wagged them back and forth while looking to the sky. Murray declined to reveal the reason, and ever since, he has continued to celebrate his victories with this gesture. Murray marked his first Wimbledon title in 2013 with the same victory salute. Then in his book Seventy-Seven; My Path to Wimbledon Glory, released in November 2013, Murray said: “The real reason is that around that time I had a few friends and family who had various issues affecting them ... I knew that they would be watching and I wanted to let them know I was thinking of them.”

After winning the Brisbane International in January 2013, he dedicated the victory to his friend Ross Hutchins who had been diagnosed with cancer in December 2012. Hutchins confirmed that Murray's victory salute after this win was a sign to him.

Other 
In 2006, there was controversy after a match with Kenneth Carlsen. Having been given a warning for racket abuse, Murray went on in the post-match interview to state that he and Carlsen had "played like women" during the first set. Murray was booed for the remark, but said later that the comment had been intended as a jocular response to what Svetlana Kuznetsova had said at the Hopman Cup. A few months later, Murray was fined for swearing at the umpire, Adel Aref during a Davis Cup doubles rubber with the Serbia and Montenegro Davis Cup team. Murray refused to shake hands with the umpire at the end of the match.

In 2007, Murray suggested that tennis had a match-fixing problem, stating that everyone knows it goes on, in the wake of the investigation surrounding Nikolay Davydenko. Both Davydenko and Rafael Nadal questioned his comments, but Murray responded that his words had been taken out of context.

In a June 2015 column written for the French sports newspaper L'Équipe, Murray criticised what he described as a double standard applied by many in their attitudes towards Amélie Mauresmo in her role as Murray's coach, highlighting how many observers attributed his poor performances during the early part of her tenure to her appointment, which Murray denied, before pointing out that his previous coaches had not been blamed by the media for other spells of poor form. He also lamented the lack of female coaches working in elite tennis, and concluded: "Have I become a feminist? Well, if being a feminist is about fighting so that a woman is treated like a man then yes, I suppose I have".  Murray has corrected others a number of times on the subject of women's tennis. After BBC host John Inverdale indirectly suggested Murray was the first person to win more than one tennis Olympic gold medal, Murray interjected; "I think Venus and Serena have won about four each." Murray has also argued that male and female tennis players should receive equal amounts of prize money.

Murray has not commented on his personal opinion on Britain's decision to leave the European Union. However, following his win at Wimbledon in 2016, he expressed his surprise at the outcome of the referendum in the UK and added that "it's important that everyone comes together to make the best of it."

Career statistics

Grand Slam performance timeline

Current through the 2023 Australian Open.

Grand Slam tournament finals: 11 (3 titles, 8 runners-up)

Year–end championships finals

Singles: 1 (1 title)

Olympic medal matches

Singles: 2 (2 gold medals)

Mixed doubles: 1 (1 silver medal)

Records and achievements

 These records were attained in the Open Era.
 Records in bold indicate peerless achievements.
 Records in italics are currently active streaks.

Professional awards
 ITF World Champion: 2016.
 ATP Player of the Year: 2016.

Awards and honours 

 BBC Young Sports Personality of the Year: 2004
 BBC Sports Personality Team of the Year: 2012, 2015
 Most Titles in an ATP World Tour Season: 6 in 2009, 9 in 2016
 US Open Series Champion: 2010, 2015
 Best ATP World Tour Match of the Year (3): 2010, 2011, 2012
 Officer of the Order of the British Empire: 2013
 Laureus "World Breakthrough of the Year" Award: 2013
 Glenfiddich Spirit of Scotland Award for Top Scot: 2013
 Glenfiddich Spirit of Scotland Award for Sport: 2013
 BBC Sports Personality of the Year: 2013, 2015, 2016
 Doctor of the University of Stirling: 2014
 Freeman of Stirling: 2014
 Freeman of Merton: 2014
 Arthur Ashe Humanitarian of the Year: 2014, 2022
 ITF Player of the Year: 2016
 Knight Bachelor: 2017
 3rd Class Order of Merit of Ukraine: 2022

See also 
 2012 Summer Olympics and Paralympics gold post boxes
 List of Grand Slam men's singles champions
 Open Era tennis records – Men's singles

Notes

References

External links 

 
 
 
 
 
 
 

 
1987 births
Dunblane massacre
Living people
Olympic medalists in tennis
Olympic gold medallists for Great Britain
Olympic silver medallists for Great Britain
Olympic tennis players of Great Britain
Medalists at the 2012 Summer Olympics
Medalists at the 2016 Summer Olympics
Tennis players at the 2008 Summer Olympics
Tennis players at the 2012 Summer Olympics
Tennis players at the 2016 Summer Olympics
Tennis players at the 2020 Summer Olympics
ATP number 1 ranked singles tennis players
Grand Slam (tennis) champions in men's singles
Wimbledon champions
US Open (tennis) champions
Grand Slam (tennis) champions in boys' singles
US Open (tennis) junior champions
Hopman Cup competitors
Male feminists
Knights Bachelor
People in sports awarded knighthoods
Officers of the Order of the British Empire
Scottish expatriate sportspeople in Spain
Scottish feminists
Scottish male tennis players
Scottish Olympic medallists
British male tennis players
Sportspeople from Glasgow
Sportspeople from Dunblane
People from Oxshott
BBC Sports Personality of the Year winners
Laureus World Sports Awards winners
ITF World Champions